A hand puppet is a type of puppet that is controlled by the hand or hands that occupies the interior of the puppet. A glove puppet is a variation of hand puppets. Rod puppets require one of the puppeteer's hands inside the puppet glove holding a rod which controls the head, and the puppet's body then hangs over most or all of the forearm of the puppeteer, and possibly extends further.  Other parts of the puppet may be controlled by different means, e.g., by rods operated by the puppeteer's free hand, or strings or levers pulled the head or body. A smaller variety, simple hand puppets often have no significant manipulable parts at all. Finger puppets are not hand puppets as they are used only on a finger.

Types of hand puppets

Simple hand puppets

The simplest hand puppets are those with few or no moving parts.  They can be stiff, made from e.g. a hard plastic, but are more often flexible, made from fabric, possibly with some stuffing and attached decorations for eyes, nose, and so on.  The mouth may be a mere decoration that does not open and close, or the thumb may enter a separate pocket from the rest of the fabric and so simulate a mandible, allowing the puppet to talk.

Simple hand puppets are usually not much larger than the hand itself. A sock puppet is a particularly simple type of hand puppet made from a sock. A glove puppet is slightly more complex, with an internal division for fingers allowing independent manipulation of a character's arms. The unconsumed hand of the puppeteer is usually concealed from the audience to maintain the illusion of the puppet.

Simple hand puppets, especially popular licensed characters, are sometimes distributed as children toys or party favors. Children usually like to experiment in play with a puppet creating voices and movements and in many cases staging a strictly private performance.

Rod puppets

A rod puppet is made out of wood wire and string and is manipulated with wooden or wire rods.<ref>Sinclair, A, The Puppetry Handbook, p.15</ref> Rod puppets can sometimes have a complete working hinged mouth but many do not. A rod puppet can have a fixed facial expression. Arms are usually a requirement as rods are attached to them. A fish rod puppet could have a rod attached to the tail to manipulate this section of the puppet. Sometimes special variants exist with additional manipulable parts: (e.g., eyelids that open and close). Many rod puppets depict only the upper half of the character, from the waist up, with the stage covering the missing remainder, but variations sometimes have legs. The legs usually just dangle, but in special cases the legs may be controlled either from behind the stage using rods from below. These are mostly used at carnivals or fairs. A very common example of rod puppets are those of The Muppets and Sesame Street.

Human-arm puppet
Also called a "two-man puppet" or a "live-hand puppet", the human-arm puppet is similar to a hand puppet but is larger and requires two puppeteers. One puppeteer places their dominant hand inside the puppet's head and operates the puppet's head and mouth, while putting their non-dominant arm into a glove and special sleeve attached to the puppet. The second puppeteer puts their arm into a glove and special sleeve attached to the puppet in order to operate the other arm. This way, the puppet can perform hand gestures. This is a form of glove or hand puppetry and rod puppetry. Some characters from The Muppets and Sesame Street fit this category.

Technique
Basic positioning

As with any stage performer, the puppet should generally face the audience; but may turn to one side or the other. There are times when a puppet does turn its back to an audience just like an actor. Puppets generally should look out towards an audience and not up at the ceiling unless they wish an audience to follow their line of vision. Generally a hand or glove puppet should talk a lot.

Body movement

One of the most important techniques in puppetry is continuous motion.  A puppet that remains still has a dull, lifeless appearance and is said to be dead''.  Motion should shift from one portion of the puppet to another, so that one moment the puppet is moving its head and the next moment shifting its torso or repositioning an arm.  The puppet may shift from side to side, look around, lean or straighten, fidget (with part of the stage, its own clothing or hair, or any available object), cross or uncross its arms, sigh, tilt its head, or make any number of other small motions, in order to continue to appear lifelike.

Depending on the type of puppet, more or less complex motion may be possible. Unrealistic motion patterns can sometimes be useful for special effect purposes. As put into words by Oscar Wilde, puppets "are admirably docile" and "recognize the presiding intellect of the dramatist".

A puppet should not move when another puppet is speaking. To do so confuses an audience as to which particular puppet is speaking at any given time. Maintaining clear focus for an audience in a puppet performance is extremely important.

Quality
Quality of hand puppets depends on three main factors: material, design, craftsmanship. Fiber Artist Shea Wilkinson said that “If you want a toy to last for 25 - 100 years, there must be a high level of craftsmanship. Factory-produced toys will rarely reach this level, as their aim is to constantly sell you new toys”.

See also
 Glove puppetry
 The Muppets
 Sock puppet
 Glycon

References

Books and articles

External links
 PuppetryLab – Advanced puppetry theory and practice tools
  Puppetools – An Online Workshop for Educators Focused on Play Language
 Hand Puppet A puppet theatre dedicated to education through puppetry and the use of hand puppets.
 Uncle Johns Puppets - A puppeteer who utilizes hand puppets instead of traditional marionettes.
 UK Puppets - A collection of UK based hand puppets

Puppetry
Glove puppetry
Handwear